Derbyshire County Cricket Club in 1898 was the cricket season when the English club  Derbyshire had been playing for twenty-seven years. It was their fourth season in the County Championship and  they won three matches to finish ninth in the Championship table.

1898 season

Derbyshire  played sixteen games in the County Championship in 1898 and one match against MCC. The captain for the year was Sydney Evershed in his eighth season as captain. William Storer was top scorer with three centuries which he achieved while also bowling to take 28 wickets and being a useful wicket-keeper. George Davidson took most wickets at 65 as well as scoring a century. The season saw many high scores, and against Hampshire in August, four Derbyshire players Levi Wright, William Storer, William Chatterton and George Davidson scored centuries followed by two more from the Hampshire players in the same match. The Derbyshire total of 645 runs was to remain their highest match score until it was surpassed in the 2007 season.  Two matches later,  Yorkshire set a record score against Derbyshire of 662 runs when Jack Brown scored 300 and John Tunnicliffe 243 in Walter Sugg's benefit match before Brown deliberately knocked down his wicket. It remained a national partnership record until two more Yorkshiremen, Percy Holmes and Herbert Sutcliffe, made 555 for the first wicket against Essex at Leyton in 1932.

The Yorkshire match was Derbyshire's second match at Queen's Park, Chesterfield, the first being earlier in the season against Surrey.  The size of the crowd at that game made the experiment well worth while and the ground, described as mre pleasing to the eye than the County Ground, became a regular venue for several matches a season. The game against Surrey was not without incident as superb lob bowling by D. L. A. Jephson, gave him nine Derbyshire wickets for 55 runs in the two innings,  Derbyshire supporters were upset by Jephson's lobs, and protested vigorously against them, saying that this was unfair bowling.

The most significant addition to the Derbyshire squad in the season was Billy Bestwick  as well known for his antics off the pitch as his demon bowling. William Ellis played the first of several seasons at the club when he played occasional games. Alfred Charlesworth and James Wright also made their debuts and played several matches in the season, although only Wright played in a subsequent season. William Prince, John Bourne and  Solomon Hardy each played just one career match for Derbyshire in the season

Matches

{| class="wikitable" width="100%"
! bgcolor="#efefef" colspan=6 | List of  matches
|- bgcolor="#efefef"
!No.
!Date
!V
!Result 
!Margin
!Notes
|- 
|1
 |16 May 1898 
| Nottinghamshire    Trent Bridge, Nottingham 
   |bgcolor="#FFCC00"|Drawn
|
| W Storer 109 
|- 
|2
|19 May 1898 
|  Surrey Kennington Oval 
|Abandoned
|
|  
|- 
|3
|23 May 1898 
| Lancashire   County Ground, Derby 
|bgcolor="#FF0000"|Lost
| 65 runs
| JJ Hulme 6-65; Cuttell 5-30; Briggs 5-34; Mold 5-27 
|- 
|4
|30 May 1898 
| Hampshire  County Ground, Southampton 
|bgcolor="#00FF00"|Won
| 10 wickets
| W Storer 104 
|- 
|5
|09 Jun 1898  
| MCC     Lord's Cricket Ground, St John's Wood 
|bgcolor="#00FF00"|Won
| Innings and 1 run
| G Davidson 6-30 and 6-53; J Hearne 6-66 
|- 
|6
|16 Jun 1898 
| Warwickshire  Edgbaston, Birmingham 
   |bgcolor="#FFCC00"|Drawn
|
| Quaife 109; Lilley 112 
|- 
|7
|20 Jun 1898 
| Essex   County Ground, Leyton 
|bgcolor="#FF0000"|Lost
| 129 runs
| G Davidson 7-42 and 8-74 
|- 
|8
|27 Jun 1898 
| Leicestershire  County Ground, Derby 
|bgcolor="#00FF00"|Won
| Innings and 31 runs
| Pougher 5-53; F Davidson 6-36; G Davidson 5-31 
|- 
|9
|30 Jun 1898 
|  Surrey  Queen's Park, Chesterfield 
|bgcolor="#FF0000"|Lost
| Innings and 43 runs
| Jephson 6-38 
|- 
|10
|04 Jul 1898 
| Essex   County Ground, Derby 
|bgcolor="#FF0000"|Lost
| Innings and 172 runs
| Perrin 104 ; McGahey 115; Kortright 5-44; Bull 6-75
|- 
|11
|11 Jul 1898 
| Nottinghamshire   County Ground, Derby  
   |bgcolor="#FFCC00"|Drawn
|
| F Davidson 6-49  
|- 
|12
|25 Jul 1898 
| Warwickshire   County Ground, Derby 
   |bgcolor="#FFCC00"|Drawn
|
| SH Evershed  153; Field 5-107 
|- 
|13
|28 Jul 1898 
| Yorkshire   St George's Road, Harrogate 
   |bgcolor="#FFCC00"|Drawn
|
| H Bagshaw 100; JW Hancock 5-61 
|- 
|14
|01 Aug 1898 
| Hampshire   County Ground, Derby 
   |bgcolor="#FFCC00"|Drawn
|
| LG Wright 134; W Storer 100; W Chatterton 142; G Davidson 108 and 6-42; Poore 121; Quinton 101 and 5-93
|- 
|15
|15 Aug 1898 
| Leicestershire  Grace Road, Leicester 
|bgcolor="#FF0000"|Lost
| Innings and 103 runs
| Geeson 6-64 and 7-38 
|- 
|16
|18 Aug 1898 
| Yorkshire  Queen's Park, Chesterfield 
|bgcolor="#FF0000"|Lost
| Innings and 387 runs
| J Brown 300; J Tunnicliffe 243 
|- 
|17
|25 Aug 1898 
| Lancashire   Old Trafford, Manchester 
 |bgcolor="#FFCC00"|Drawn
|
| J Tyldesley 200; Cuttell 5-48 
|- 
|

Statistics

County Championship batting averages

County Championship bowling averages

Wicket Keeper

 W Storer Catches 24,  Stumping  1 
 W Chatterton  Catches 13,  Stumping  1 
 LG Wright Catches 10,  Stumping  2

See also
Derbyshire County Cricket Club seasons
1898 English cricket season

References

1898 in English cricket
Derbyshire County Cricket Club seasons
English cricket seasons in the 19th century